Carleton Hunt (January 1, 1836 – August 14, 1921) was a member of the U.S. House of Representatives representing the state of Louisiana.  He served one term as a Democrat.

Hunt was born in New Orleans and attended Harvard and law school at Tulane.  Prior to the Civil War he had been affiliated with the Constitutional Union Party.  He was a professor and ten-year dean of the law school at Tulane.  He served as a lieutenant in the Confederate artillery during the Civil War.

Carleton Hunt was the son of prominent New Orleans physician Thomas Hunt (1808-1867), who was one of the founders of Tulane University's medical school, and the former Aglae Marie Carleton (1816-1847). He married Georgine Cammack; the couple had three sons, who became a doctor and two lawyers. Hunt died in New Orleans.

External links 

Harvard University Archives. Civil War papers of Carleton Hunt, 1861-1864.

1836 births
1921 deaths
Harvard University alumni
Louisiana Unionists
Democratic Party members of the United States House of Representatives from Louisiana
Tulane University Law School alumni